The Hermitage of Greccio Sanctuary is one of the four shrines erected by St. Francis in the Sacred Valley, along with the Sanctuary of Fonte Colombo, the Sanctuary of the Forest, and the convent of Poggio Bustone.

Legend
The St. Francis legendarium affirms that he chose this place for devotions. A story within the legendarium tells of a child to whom Francis threw a firebrand, flying like an arrow, and it landed on the rock wall of a hill, the Velita, owned by a lord of Greccio.  In 1223, Francis here observed and oversaw a retelling, with live people, of the story the birth of Christ on Christmas Eve. Legend has it that a little boy, the only character not part of the living re-enactment, came to life during the event, before returning to death. Since then, Greccio and its sanctuary is the country of the first nativity scene in the world. Later it was twinned with Bethlehem.

Sanctuary and chapel
The shrine is a Latin cross, characterized by a side wall and an apse hexagonal. The mullioned windows are Gothic style. Inside there are frescoes modern and original chapel of the saint carved in the rock. The church is located after crossing the square. It joins the refectory. The church has a Latin cross with a bell tower. Under the medieval church is the crypt of St. Francis with a lunette showing the 'Preparation of the Nativity. The painting dates from the 13th century.

Gallery

External links

Churches in the province of Rieti
Franciscan churches in Italy
Franciscan convents
Romanesque architecture in Lazio
Roman Catholic shrines
13th-century Roman Catholic church buildings in Italy